Lyces tamara is a moth of the family Notodontidae first described by Hering in 1925. It is found in southern Mexico and Guatemala.

External links
Species page at Tree of Life Web Project

Notodontidae
Moths described in 1925